Muhammad Pasha al-Shalik (also known as Ishalyq Mehmed Pasha, surname also spelled Jalik) was the Ottoman governor of Damascus in 1760, but he was replaced later that year by Uthman Pasha al-Kurji. He served a total of nine months as Wali of Damascus. According to historian Ahmad Hasan Joudah, the conditions under which Muhammad Pasha ruled were "unfavorable" and included devastating earthquakes,a six month-long plague that spread across Ottoman Syria from Antioch to Gaza, a massive food shortage due to the loss of much of the harvest during a frost. Unable to alleviate the situation in Damascus, Muhammad Pasha was dismissed.

References

Bibliography

18th-century people from the Ottoman Empire
Ottoman governors of Damascus